Serpa cheese is a type of cheese from Serpa, Alentejo, Portugal. It has a Protected designation of origin (PDO) and is listed on the Ark of Taste.

References

Portuguese cheeses
Portuguese products with protected designation of origin